Dorcadion bernhauerorum is a species of beetle in the family Cerambycidae. It was described by Peks in 2010.

References

bernhauerorum
Beetles described in 2010